The houses at 76–96 Harvard Avenue are historic rowhouses in Brookline, Massachusetts.  Built in 1903 by Benjamin Whitney, this was one of the earliest series of rowhouses to be built in Brookline.  They are of Colonial Revival style, built in brick with limestone trim, with iron balconies.  Originally built as single-family units, each of the houses except number 76 was converted to three apartments in the 1940s and 1950s.

The rowhouses were listed on the National Register of Historic Places in 1985.

See also
National Register of Historic Places listings in Brookline, Massachusetts

References

Colonial Revival architecture in Massachusetts
Houses completed in 1903
Houses in Brookline, Massachusetts
National Register of Historic Places in Brookline, Massachusetts
Houses on the National Register of Historic Places in Norfolk County, Massachusetts